Platy may refer to:
 Platy (fish), two related species of fish, both referred to as platies:
 Southern platyfish
 Variable platyfish
 Platy, Imathia, a town in Imathia, Greece
 Platy, Lemnos, a village on the island of Lemnos, Greece
 Platy, a class of structure of peds (soil particles)